Kurjak is a Bosnian, Croatian and Serbian word, meaning wolf or "black wolf". It may refer to:

People
Asim Kurjak (born 1942), Bosnian scientist
Jelica Kurjak (born 1952), Serbian diplomat
Darko Kurjak, Serbian drummer in Partibrejkers and Oružjem Protivu Otmičara

Other
Kurjak, a village in Udbina, Croatia
KURJAK, a Yugoimport SDPR upgrade package for BRDM-2

See also
Kurjače, village in Serbia

Serbian surnames
Bosnian surnames